Andranik Karapetyan (born December 15, 1995 in Vagharshapat, Armenia), is an Armenian weightlifter.

Biography
Karapetyan won a gold medal at the 2016 European Weightlifting Championships snatching 170 kg and clean and jerking 197 kg, setting 367 kg for total. He competed in 2015 World Weightlifting Championships and came 4th in total, but following disqualification of North Korean  weightlifter Kim Kwang-song Karapetyan received the bronze medal in total (363 kg). Andranik failed to place in the 2016 Summer Olympics when he dislocated his left elbow while performing the clean and jerk.

References

External links
 

Armenian male weightlifters
European champions in weightlifting
European champions for Armenia
Olympic weightlifters of Armenia
Weightlifters at the 2016 Summer Olympics
1995 births
Living people
Universiade medalists in weightlifting
Universiade silver medalists for Armenia
European Weightlifting Championships medalists
World Weightlifting Championships medalists
20th-century Armenian people
21st-century Armenian people